Tönning station is a railway station in the municipality of Tönning, located in the Nordfriesland district in Schleswig-Holstein, Germany.

References

Railway stations in Schleswig-Holstein
Buildings and structures in Nordfriesland